Gary Jack Johnson (born 14 September 1959) is an English retired professional footballer who played as a forward in Football League for Aldershot, Brentford and Chelsea. He also played in South Africa.

Career 
A forward, Johnson began his career in the Chelsea youth system in 1970. He signed his first professional contract in September 1977 and scored 9 goals in 22 appearances, before his surprise departure to Third Division club Brentford in December 1980. After arriving at Griffin Park in a £30,000 double-deal with Lee Frost, Johnson lacked the pace and presence to establish himself at the club and leg injuries suffered in a car crash during the 1982 off-season effectively ended his career with the club. Johnson was released by Brentford at the end of the 1982–83 season, after making 65 appearances and scoring 14 goals during -years at Griffin Park.

After a spell with Plate Glass Rangers in South Africa, Johnson returned to England to join Fourth Division club Aldershot in August 1985. Over the course of three seasons at the Recreation Ground, Johnson made 75 league appearances and scored 20 goals and closed out his career in non-League football with Leatherhead.

Personal life 
Johnson is a London taxi driver. In December 2016, as the United Kingdom football sexual abuse scandal evolved, Johnson waived his right to anonymity and claimed he had been abused from the age of 13 by Chelsea's then-chief scout, Eddie Heath. It was reported that in July 2015, he had been paid £50,000 by Chelsea not to go public with the allegations. Chelsea apologised "profusely" to Johnson, who demanded further financial compensation from the club.

Career statistics

References 

English footballers
English Football League players
1959 births
Living people
Chelsea F.C. players
Brentford F.C. players
Aldershot F.C. players
Leatherhead F.C. players
Expatriate soccer players in South Africa
Association football forwards
Footballers from Peckham
English expatriates in South Africa
Isthmian League players